Gwyn Richards (born 29 November 1951) is a former Welsh cricketer. Richards was a right-handed batsman who bowled right-arm off break. He was born at Maesteg, Glamorgan. Richards has recently retired from owning a sport shop in Maesteg.

References

External links
Gwyn Richards at ESPNcricinfo
Gwyn Richards at CricketArchive

1951 births
Living people
Sportspeople from Maesteg
Welsh cricketers
Glamorgan cricketers